The third cabinet of Miron Cristea was the government of Romania from 1 February to 6 March 1939. Miron Cristea was the Patriarch of the Romanian Orthodox Church since 1925. Cristea died on 6 March 1939.

Ministers
The ministers of the cabinet were as follows:

President of the Council of Ministers:
Miron Cristea (1 February - 6 March 1939)
Vice President of the Council of Ministers and Minister of the Interior:
Armand Călinescu (1 February - 6 March 1939)
Minister of Foreign Affairs: 
Grigore Gafencu (1 February - 6 March 1939)
Minister of Finance:
Mitiță Constantinescu (1 February - 6 March 1939)
Minister of Justice:
Victor Iamandi (1 February - 6 March 1939)
Minister of National Defence:
(interim) Armand Călinescu (1 February - 6 March 1939)
Minister of Air and Marine:
Gen. Paul Teodorescu (1 February - 6 March 1939)
Minister of Materiel:
Victor Slăvescu (1 February - 6 March 1939)
Minister of National Economy:
Ion Bujoiu (1 February - 6 March 1939)
Minister of Agriculture and Property
Nicolae Cornățeanu (1 February - 6 March 1939)
Minister of Public Works and Communications:
Mihail Ghelmegeanu (1 February - 6 March 1939)
Minister of National Education:
Petre Andrei (1 February - 6 March 1939)
Minister of Religious Affairs and the Arts:
Nicolae Zigre (1 February - 6 March 1939)
Minister of Labour:
Mihail Ralea (1 February - 6 March 1939)
Minister of Health and Social Security
Gen. Nicolae Marinescu (1 February - 6 March 1939)
Minister of State for Minorities:
Silviu Dragomir (1 February - 6 March 1939)

References

Cabinets of Romania
Cabinets established in 1939
Cabinets disestablished in 1939
1939 establishments in Romania
1939 disestablishments in Romania